Textual variants in the Book of Exodus concerns textual variants in the Hebrew Bible found in the Book of Exodus.

Legend

List 

This list provides examples of known textual variants, and contains the following parameters: Hebrew texts written right to left, the Hebrew text romanised left to right, an approximate English translation, and which Hebrew manuscripts or critical editions of the Hebrew Bible this textual variant can be found in. Greek (Septuagint) and Latin (Vulgate) texts are written left to right, and not romanised. Sometimes additional translation or interpretation notes are added, with references to similar verses elsewhere, or in-depth articles on the topic in question.
 Exodus 1 
Exodus 1:11
  – MT
  – LXX ABP
  – OL Vg
  – OL

Exodus 1:15
  – MT
  – LXX ABP
  – OL 
  – Vg

 Exodus 3 
Exodus 3:14
  – WLC
  – LXX 
  – ABP
  – Vg
 See also I Am that I Am, Burning bush, and Yahweh § Name.

 Exodus 6 
Exodus 6:14
  – MT
  – LXX
  – ABP
  – OL
  –  Vg

Exodus 6:15
  – MT
  – LXX
  – B
  – ABP
  – OL Vg

Exodus 6:15
  – MT
  – LXX ABP
  – OL
  –  Vg

Exodus 6:21
  – MT
  – LXX
  – B
  – ABP
  – OL
  –  Vg

Exodus 6:22
  – MT
  – LXX ABP
  – OL
  –  Vg

Exodus 6:22
  – MT
  – LXX
  – ABP
  – OL
  –  Vg

Exodus 6:23
  – MT
  – LXX ABP
  – OL
  –  Vg

Exodus 6:24
  – MT
  – LXX
  – A B ABP
  – OL
  – Vg

Exodus 6:25
  – MT
  – LXX ABP
  – OL
  – Vg

 Exodus 13 
Exodus 13:20
  – MT
  – LXX
  – OL
  –  Vg

 Exodus 14 
Exodus 14:2
  – MT
  – LXX ABP
  – OL
  – Vg

Exodus 14:9
  – MT
  – LXX ABP
  – OL
  – Vg

 Exodus 17 
Exodus 17:1, see also Battle of Refidim
  – MT
  – LXX
  – ABP
  – OL
  – OL
  – Vg

Exodus 17:8, see also Battle of Refidim
  – MT
  – LXX
  – ABP
  – OL
  – OL
  – Vg

 Exodus 19 
Exodus 19:2, see also Battle of Refidim
  – MT
  – LXX
  – ABP
  – OL
  – OL
  – Vg

Exodus 19:16
  – WLC
  – SP
  – LXX Brenton
  – ABP
  – Vg
Compare Exodus 20:18.

 Exodus 20 

Exodus 20:1
  – WLC (1QExod 4QPaleoExod) SP
  – LXX LXX LXX Brenton ABP
  – Vg Vg
 Compare Deuteronomy 5:5.

Exodus 20:2, see also I am the Lord thy God
  – WLC
  – LXX 
  – Brenton
  – LXX ABP
  – Vg
 Compare Deuteronomy 5:6.

Exodus 20:2, see also I am the Lord thy God
  – LXX (Pontic Greek spelling)
  – LXX Brenton ABP (Attic and Koine Greek spelling)
 Compare Deuteronomy 5:6.

Exodus 20:3, see also Thou shalt have no other gods before me
  – WLC
  ’ă-ḥê-rîm is from H312 אחר (achér), which can mean "another", "other", "different", "further", "subsequent", "following", "next", "after".
  al- is from H5921 על (al), which can mean "over", "against", "above", "beside(s)" (or "along(side)"), "about/concerning", "according", or many other less frequent meanings, and features in the name El Al ("Upwards").
  – LXX LXX Brenton ABP
 ἕτεροι heteroi is from ἕτερος, which can mean "other", "another", "different", "second", "after", and the origin of the English word hetero-.
  – Vg
 alienos is from aliēnus (compare alius and alter), and the origin of the English word alien.
 Compare Deuteronomy 5:7 (Hebrew witnesses identical, Greek and Latin witnesses different).

Exodus 20:5, see also Thou shalt not make unto thee any graven image
  – MT WLC SP
  – Pap (H7072 instead of H7067  qanna in MT SP)
  – LXX LXX Brenton ABP
 The words ζῆλος and ζηλωτής are the roots of many words including zeal, zealot, zealotry, zealous, jealous and jealousy.
  – Vg
 Compare Deuteronomy 5:9.

Exodus 20:5, see also Thou shalt not make unto thee any graven image
  – WLC
  – LXX LXX Brenton
  – ABP
  – Vg
 Compare Deuteronomy 5:9.

Exodus 20:7, see also Thou shalt not take the name of the Lord thy God in vain
  – ABP Brenton (classical Greek spelling)
  – LXX LXX (Koine Greek spelling)
 Compare Deuteronomy 5:11.

Exodus 20:7, see also Thou shalt not take the name of the Lord thy God in vain
  – WLC
  – LXX LXX
  – ABP
  – Brenton
  – Vg
 Compare Deuteronomy 5:11.

Exodus 20:10, see also Remember the sabbath day, to keep it holy
  – WLC
  – LXX LXX Brenton ABP
  – Vg

Exodus 20:10, see also Remember the sabbath day, to keep it holy
  – WLC
  – LXX LXX Brenton ABP
  – Vg

Exodus 20:11, see also Remember the sabbath day, to keep it holy
  – WLC
  – LXX Brenton ABP
  – Vg
 omitted – LXX 
 Compare Deuteronomy 5:15 (an entirely different sentence in all witnesses, which supports Sabbath observance by reference to the Exodus rather than the Genesis creation narrative).

Exodus 20:11, see also Remember the sabbath day, to keep it holy
  – WLC. 
 The noun H7676  shabbath "Sabbath" (Greek: G4521 σάββατον) is derived from, but independent of, the adjective H7637  šə-ḇî-‘î "seventh" (Greek: G1442 ἕβδομος/ἕβδομη, see hebdo-) earlier in this verse. See Biblical Sabbath § Etymology.
  – LXX LXX Brenton ABP
  – Vg
 Compare Deuteronomy 5:15 (an entirely different sentence in all witnesses, which supports Sabbath observance by reference to the Exodus rather than the Genesis creation narrative).

Exodus 20:12, see also Honour thy father and thy mother
  – LXX LXX Brenton ABP 
 omitted – WLC Vg
Compare Deuteronomy 5:16 (where this phrase is identical in Greek witnesses, and not omitted in Hebrew and Latin witnesses, albeit phrased slightly differently from Greek).

Exodus 20:13–15, see also Thou shalt not kill, Thou shalt not commit adultery and Thou shalt not steal
  – MT WLC SP
  – Pap
  – LXX LXX Brenton
  – ABP 
 The verb κλέπτω ("to steal") is at the root of modern English words such as kleptomania and kleptocracy.
  – Vg
 Compare Deuteronomy 5:17–19.

Exodus 20:16, see also Thou shalt not bear false witness against thy neighbour
  – WLC
  – LXX LXX Brenton ABP
  – Vg

Exodus 20:17, see also Thou shalt not covet
  – WLC
  – LXX LXX Brenton
  – ABP
  – Vg
 concupīscō is derived from (con)cupiō ("I desire"), the origin of the English verb "to covet" and the name of the Roman god Cupid. 

Exodus 20:17, see also Thou shalt not covet
  – LXX LXX Brenton ABP
 omitted – WLC Vg

Exodus 20:18
  – WLC
  – LXX LXX Brenton 
  – ABP
  – Vg

Exodus 20:18
  – WLC
  – LXX LXX Brenton ABP. φωνή and λᾰμπᾰ́ς are the origins of the English words phone and lamp respectively.
  – Vg. vōx is the root of the English word voice.
Compare Exodus 19:16

Exodus 20:19
  – WLC
  – LXX Brenton 
  – LXX ABP
  – Vg

Exodus 20:20
  – LXX
  – LXX Brenton ABP

Exodus 20:21
  – LXX
  – LXX Brenton
  –  ABP

Exodus 20:23
  – MT WLC
  – SP

Exodus 20:23
  – WLC
  – LXX
  – Brenton
  – LXX ABP
  – Vg

Exodus 20:26
  – WLC
  – LXX LXX Brenton ABP
 ἀποκαλύψῃς is likely a misspelling of the verb ἀποκαλύψεις. The noun αποκάλυψη is the root of words such as apocalypse, apocalyptic and apocalypticism.
  – Vg
 Compare Leviticus 18.

 Exodus 32 

 Exodus 34 

Exodus 34:11
  – WLC
  – LXX 
  – LXX Brenton
  – ABP
  – Vg

Exodus 34:14, see also Thou shalt have no other gods before me
  – WLC
  – LXX Brenton
  – LXX ABP
  – Vg
 Compare Exodus 20:3 and Deuteronomy 5:7,9.

Exodus 34:17, see also Thou shalt not make unto thee any graven image
  – WLC
  – LXX LXX Brenton ABP
  – Vg
 Compare Exodus 20:5 and Deuteronomy 5:8.

See also 
 List of Hebrew Bible manuscripts
 Septuagint manuscripts
 Vetus Latina § Old Testament manuscripts
 Vulgate manuscripts

References

Bibliography 
 
 
 
 
 
  (E-book edition)
 
 Emanuel Tov, The Text-Critical Use of the Septuagint in Biblical Research (TCU), 1981 (1st edition), 1997 (2nd edition), 2015 (3rd edition).
 Emanuel Tov, Textual Criticism of the Hebrew Bible (TCHB), 1992 (1st edition), 2001 (2nd edition), 2012 (3rd edition).
 Emanuel Tov, Textual Criticism of the Hebrew Bible, Qumran, Septuagint: Collected Writings, Volume 3 (2015).

External links 
 Digitized Hebrew and Greek Manuscripts: Access and Issues – Introduction to online biblical textual studies

Biblical criticism
Early versions of the Bible
Book of Exodus
Hebrew Bible versions and translations
Jewish manuscripts
Old Testament-related lists
Septuagint manuscripts
Textual criticism